Kurt Edelhagen (born 5 June 1920 – 8 February 1982) was a German big band leader.

He was born in Herne, North Rhine-Westphalia, Germany. Edelhagen studied conducting and piano in Essen. In 1945, he started a trio, then a big band a year later. He performed on the radio station in Frankfurt am Main, then for three years beginning in 1949 led the Bayerischer Rundfunk in Nuremberg. From 1952 to 1957 he led the Südwestfunk big band. In 1954, he participated in the Concerto for jazz band and orchestra by Rolf Libermann. Three years later, he began leading the radio station Westdeutscher Rundfunk (WDR) big band in Cologne. Members included Dusko Goykovich and Jiggs Whigham. The band toured East Germany, USSR, Czechoslovakia, and several Arab countries during the 1960s.

His radio orchestra played at the opening ceremony of the 1972 Munich Olympics.

He died in February 1982 in Cologne, at the age of 61.

References

1920 births
1982 deaths
People from Herne, North Rhine-Westphalia
Officers Crosses of the Order of Merit of the Federal Republic of Germany
20th-century German musicians